Enneapterygius randalli, the Rapa triplefin, is a species of triplefin blenny in the genus Enneapterygius. It was described by Ronald Fricke in 1997. who honoured the American ichthyologist John Ernest Randall in its specific name, Randall collected many of the type series. This species is known only from French Polynesia where it is found off Rapa Iti and Marotiri in the southern Austral Islands.

References

randalli
Fish described in 1997